Patola is a 1988 Punjabi film, produced by J.P. Pardesi, Rammi Bhalwan and Manjit Lovely. It was directed by Jagjeet, with music by Mohammad Sadiq.

Cast
 Veerendra ... Balwant 'Ballu'
 Gurcharan Pohli ... Mangal
 Daljeet Kaur ... Raani                                                                                                                                  
 Shobhini Singh ... Taaro
 Satish Kaul ... Amar
 Surinder Shinda ... Dharma
 Gauri Khurana ... Gurmeet kaur    
 Amar Singh Chamkila ... Live Performance- Akhara
 Amarjyot Kaur ... Live Performance- Akhara
 Mohammad Sadiq ... Kishna Kautki
 Mehar Mittal ... Ghichroo  
 Pooja Lakhi ... Melo                                                                                                                                                                                                                                     
 Ranjit Kaur ... Special appearance in Gidha
 Harbhajan Jabbal ... Tota Amli
 Saroop Parinda ... Chachi 
 Rami Pehalwan

References

External links

1987 films
Punjabi-language Indian films
1980s Punjabi-language films